The Golden Jubilee Medical Center is a hospital operated by the Faculty of Medicine Siriraj Hospital of Mahidol University. It is located near the Mahidol University Salaya Campus in Phutthamonthon District, Nakhon Pathom Province.

History 
The hospital was operated by the Office of the President, Mahidol University until 1 October 2017, when operations were transferred to the Faculty of Medicine Siriraj Hospital. The number of beds is planned to increase from 60 to 200 beds.

See also 
 Hospitals in Thailand

References 

 Article incorporates material from the corresponding article in the Thai Wikipedia

Siriraj
Teaching hospitals in Thailand
Hospitals in Thailand
Buildings and structures in Nakhon Pathom province